Calosoma scrutator, also known as the fiery searcher and caterpillar hunter, is a species of ground beetle belonging to the genus Calosoma, subgenus Acalosoma. The distribution of this species is relatively widespread, but it is nonetheless uncommon in North America. The adult beetle is known to excrete a foul-smelling oil when it is handled. The oil has been described as smelling similar to rotten milk or rancid olive oil.

References

External links

Calosoma scrutator on bugguide.net
Article and picture on the University of Arkansas website

scrutator
Beetles described in 1781
Beetles of North America
Articles containing video clips